Liao Qiuyun (born 13 July 1995) is a Chinese weightlifter. She is the silver medalist at the 2020 Summer Olympics in Tokyo and World and Asian Champion. She competes in the women's 55 kg division.

Career
In early 2019 she competed at the 2019 IWF World Cup in the 55 kg division and won gold medals in all lifts. Later in 2019 she competed at the 2019 Asian Weightlifting Championships in the 55 kg category, won gold medals in all lifts, and set a world record in the clean & jerk with a lift of 128 kg. She outlifted silver medalist Hidilyn Diaz by 15 kg. In 2021 at the 2020 Summer Olympics, she won China a silver medal in women's 55 kg weightlifting.

Major results

References

External links
 

1995 births
Living people
Place of birth missing (living people)
Olympic medalists in weightlifting
World record holders in weightlifting
Chinese female weightlifters
World Weightlifting Championships medalists
Weightlifters at the 2020 Summer Olympics
Olympic silver medalists for China
Medalists at the 2020 Summer Olympics
Olympic weightlifters of China
20th-century Chinese women
21st-century Chinese women